Fisher Potter Hodas is a law firm based in West Palm Beach, Florida. It specializes in the divorces of billionaires, CEOs, and major sports figures. The firm's work in international asset recovery was chronicled in The New York Times investigative story "How to Hide $400 Million," written by Nicholas Confessore.

Background
The firm was founded in 2011 by Jeffrey D. Fisher and Zachary Potter. Fisher graduated from the University of Miami School of Law in 1980. He clerked with United States District Court Judge Eugene P. Spellman before working as a federal prosecutor at the United States Attorney’s Office for the Southern District of Florida. Fisher handled cases involving drug smuggling, weapons violations, counterfeiting, and money laundering for the United States government from 1982 until late 1985. In 1986, Fisher opened the Florida office of Boston-based law firm Friedman & Atherton, where he was a protégé of renown Boston attorney Joel A. Kozol.  Fisher transitioned into divorce law in 1991, when he represented Nancy Bernard in her divorce from New York Yankees part-owner Jack Satter. In November 2002, Worth magazine named Fisher one of the nation's top ten divorce attorneys.

Fisher was joined by Zachary Potter in 2011. Before joining Fisher, Potter was a corporate litigator at Holland & Knight. Potter graduated from Princeton University and Yale Law School and clerked for Judge Richard J. Cardamone of the United States Court of Appeals for the Second Circuit in New York. Potter has won awards in the Palm Beach area for his fundraising on behalf of the Leukemia and Lymphoma Society.

The firm acquired its current name on January 1, 2018, when Fisher and Potter joined practices with the Law Office of Benjamin T. Hodas and became Fisher, Potter, & Hodas, PLLC. Hodas is board certified by the Florida Bar in marital and family law and served on the Executive Council of the Florida Bar Family Law Section. In 2017, Brendon Carrington joined the firm. Carrington is a graduate of Princeton University and Harvard Law School. He clerked for the Honorable Patrick E. Higginbotham in the United States Court of Appeals for the Fifth Circuit, and worked for Ropes & Gray prior to joining Fisher's team. Carrington became a partner at the firm in 2020.  On March 1, 2020, Gerald F. Richman joined the firm. Richman is a former president of the Florida Bar. He has served on the Florida Supreme Court Judicial Evaluations Committee and as Chairman of the Fourth District Court of Appeal Judicial Nomination Commission. Over the course of his career, Richman was a Captain in the United States Army, a JAG Corps officer, and a White House aide to President Lyndon B. Johnson.

Notable clients
Fisher Potter Hodas handles complex divorce cases and related civil litigation throughout Florida. Fisher's first divorce case, Nancy Bernard's divorce from New York Yankees part-owner Jack Satter, was televised in the early days of Court TV. The firm's other clients have included professional golfer Greg Norman, the ex-husband of tennis star Chris Evert; Lisa Leder, ex-wife of Sun Capital founder Marc J. Leder; Angela Koch, ex-wife of billionaire America's Cup winner Bill Koch; Brooke Sealey, ex-wife of NASCAR racer Jeff Gordon; Susan Markin, ex-wife of Checker Motor Corporation owner David Markin; Ashley Kozel, ex-wife of Gulf Keystone Petroleum CEO Todd Kozel; Katherine Bellissimo, ex-wife of equestrian entrepreneur Mark Bellissimo, and musician Phil Collins. 

In 2015 through 2017, Fisher Potter Hodas represented Sarah Pursglove in her international divorce from Finnish internet entrepreneur Robert Oesterlund. The case involved asset recovery actions around the world and was the subject of a New York Times Magazine article titled "How to Hide $400 Million." In 2018 and 2019, the firm simultaneously represented nearly 70 entities with equity interests involved in the divorce of Burton and Lucille "Lovey" Handelsman.

While many of the firm's clients remain anonymous, some client's names become public when their cases go to trial due to Florida's open court policies.  From 2016 through 2022, the firm's lawyers have tried to completion two cases involving assets in excess of $500 million,  and multiple cases with assets in excess of $50 million. Other cases have privately settled.

See also 
Holland & Knight
Broad and Cassel

References

External links
Fisher Potter Hodas website

Law firms based in Florida
Law firms established in 2011